The President of Welsh Tribunals is a senior judge in Wales who presides over the Welsh tribunal system. The position was established by the Wales Act 2017 and is the first senior judicial role relating solely to Wales. The President of the Welsh Tribunals is not a devolved subject matter, however the Senedd may create additional Welsh tribunals.

Appointment and functions

The President of Welsh Tribunals is appointed by the Lord Chief Justice after consultation with the Welsh Ministers and Lord Chancellor, if no agreement is met then the recruitment may be referred to the Judicial Appointments Commission. The President of the Welsh Tribunals must satisfy the judicial-appointment eligibility condition on a seven-year basis.

The President must have regard to the need for the following:

Welsh Tribunals to be accessible
Proceedings before tribunals to be fair and handled quickly and efficiently
Members of tribunals to be experts in the subject-matter of, or the law to be applied in, cases in which they decide matters—and the need to develop innovative methods of resolving disputes that are of a type that may be brought before tribunals.

The President of Welsh Tribunals can make representations to the Senedd and Welsh Ministers about tribunal members and the administration of justice by tribunals.

The Welsh Tribunals

The Welsh Tribunals which fall under the President's remit are:

 the Agricultural Land Tribunal for Wales
 the Mental Health Review Tribunal for Wales
 the Residential Property Tribunal for Wales
 the Special Educational Needs Tribunal for Wales
 the Welsh Language Tribunal
 a tribunal drawn from the Adjudication Panel for Wales
 a rent assessment committee constituted in accordance with Schedule 10 to the Rent Act 1977 (including a leasehold valuation tribunal and a residential property tribunal)
 a tribunal constituted in accordance with Schedule 3 to the Education Act 2005 (registration of inspectors in Wales: tribunals hearing appeals under section 27);

List of presidents
 Sir Wyn Williams December 2017 – present

See also
Senior President of Tribunals
President of the Supreme Court of the United Kingdom

References
 This article contains prose copied from Parliamentary information licensed under the Open Parliament Licence v3.0.

External links
Welsh Tribunals

 
Judiciaries of the United Kingdom
2017 establishments in the United Kingdom
United Kingdom tribunals
Lists of judges in the United Kingdom